Bihenduloceras is an Upper Jurassic perisphinctacean ammonite and member of the olcostephanid subfamily Spiticeratine.  Its shell has a subquadrate whorl section, flattended venter, and fine ribs that spring in bundles from large umbilical tubercles.

References
Notes

Bibliography
Arkell, et al., 1957. Mesozoic Ammonoidea; Treatise on Invertebrate Paleontology, Part L. Geological Society of America and University of Kansas Press.

Perisphinctoidea
Jurassic ammonites
Tithonian life